Hua Na Dam, in Kanthararom District, Sisaket Province, is the biggest dam in the Khong-Chi-Mun project in Thailand. It is close to the Rasi Salai Dam, which has been inoperable for over 10 years because of extreme salinity. Hua Na sits atop the same salt dome as Rasi Salai and may face the same fate if the gates are ever closed. The reservoir has a manageable storage capacity of 64.98 million cubic metres.

It exceeded its budget of 1.5 billion baht, costing 2.5 billion.

Opponents note that no Environmental Impact Assessment (EIA) was completed before construction, leaving concerns about flooding and salinity unresolved. Clay resources, which provide a primary occupation for many villagers, would be endangered if the dam gates were closed.

References

External links

Dams in Thailand
Hydroelectric power stations in Thailand
Isan
Dams completed in 1994
Buildings and structures in Sisaket province
1994 establishments in Thailand
Energy infrastructure completed in 1994